Trick 'r Treat is a 2007 American anthology horror comedy film written and directed by Michael Dougherty and produced by Bryan Singer. The film stars Dylan Baker, Rochelle Aytes, Anna Paquin and Brian Cox. It relates four Halloween horror stories with a common element in them: Sam, a trick-or-treater wearing orange footie pajamas with a burlap sack over his head. The character makes an appearance in each of the stories whenever one of the other characters breaks a Halloween tradition.

Despite being delayed for two years and having only a limited number of screenings at film festivals, the film received much critical acclaim and has since garnered a strong cult following.

Plot 

The film is framed by Halloween night in the fictional town of Warren Valley, Ohio. The plot follows a nonlinear narrative, with characters crossing paths throughout the film. At the center of the story is Sam, a peculiar trick-or-treater in a burlap pajama costume, who appears to enforce the "rules" of Halloween.

Opening
In the opening scene, Emma and her Halloween-loving husband Henry return home after a celebratory night. Emma (who hates Halloween) blows out their jack-o'-lantern before midnight against Henry's superstitious advice. As Henry relaxes and falls asleep in the house, Emma begins tearing down the front lawn decorations without his knowing; but is then ambushed and murdered by an unseen assailant. Later, Henry discovers her mutilated corpse on display with the decorations.

Principal 
Charlie, an overweight child who vandalizes jack-o'-lanterns, is caught stealing candy from an unattended bowl left by his school principal Steven Wilkins. Seemingly taking the offense in stride, Wilkins offers Charlie a candy bar while lecturing Charlie on the importance of respecting Halloween rules and traditions. Charlie gradually feels more unwell until he begins to vomit chocolate and blood. As Charlie dies, Wilkins reveals that he laced the candy with cyanide, remarking "You should always check your candy."

While clumsily attempting to hide the murder, he hands out candy to trick-or-treaters, including Sam. Wilkins attempts to bury Charlie in his backyard along with the body of another victim, but is continually interrupted by his young son Billy; his cantankerous elderly neighbor, Mr. Kreeg; and Kreeg’s dog Spite. The other victim turns out to still be alive and struggles in his sack, forcing Wilkins to violently beat him to death with a shovel before anyone can discern the noise.

When Wilkins returns indoors, he briefly notices Kreeg at the window, screaming for help before something seems to attack him. Wilkins guides Billy downstairs to carve a jack-o'-lantern, hiding a knife behind his back. After some hesitation, Wilkins appears to stab Billy. However, Billy is unharmed and it is revealed that the knife was plunged into Charlie's severed head, the "jack-o'-lantern" they are about to carve.

Halloween School Bus Massacre
A group of teenage trick-or-treaters (Macy, Chip, Schrader, and Sara) are collecting jack-o'-lanterns when they meet Rhonda, a Halloween traditionalist dressed as a witch. The group, led by Macy, visits a flooded quarry where she tells the urban legend of the "Halloween School Bus Massacre". In this legend, eight disabled children were killed by a school bus driver on Halloween. The children's parents (weary of the burden of caring for them and resenting them for their disabilities simply out of social embarrassment) wanted nothing more than to be rid of them; so they  paid the bus driver to dispose of them. However, before the driver could complete his plan, one child escaped his shackles and took control of the bus. The boy accidentally started the bus as it was on the edge of a cliff, causing the bus to fall into the quarry. The children drowned, though the driver survived.

Macy leaves eight jack-o'-lanterns by the lake as a tribute to the deceased. The group splits up, leaving Rhonda and Chip behind. Rhonda is pursued by horrifying figures, but once she is reduced to tears the other teens claim responsibility, revealing that they disguised themselves as the dead children in an attempt to prank her, all planned out by Macy. Schrader realizes that the trick has gone too far and comforts the terrified Rhonda while a bitter Macy kicks a jack-o'-lantern into the water. The dead children emerge from the lake, attacking Macy and Sara. Sara is dragged away and killed while Rhonda escapes, abandoning the other three teens to their gruesome fate as revenge for their heartless prank on her. As she leaves, Rhonda encounters Sam and exchanges a nod of respect toward him.

Surprise Party
Laurie, a self-conscious 22-year-old, joins her sister Danielle and friends Maria and Janet for Halloween. She winds up with a "Little Red Riding Hood" costume that (in her opinion) makes her "look like she's five" in comparison to her friends' revealing outfits.

A staunch traditionalist, Laurie misses just trick-or-treating which her sister and friends casually disregard. The other girls pick up dates, but Laurie declines in favor of staying to enjoy the town festival instead. She later encounters a hooded man dressed as a vampire who follows her into the woods and attacks her. A bundle of red cloth falls out of a tree, revealing a bloody and fearful killer. Laurie's friends unmask the incapacitated man, after Laurie remarks that he bit her. He is revealed to be Steven Wilkins, revealed to be a serial killer who had sought out victims at the festival. 

Laurie's friends are then revealed to be werewolves, shedding their clothing and skin before feasting on their deceased dates. Laurie, this being her first time consuming someone, makes an exception. She is the last to transform and kills Wilkins before devouring him. Sitting on a log nearby, Sam witnesses the werewolves’ feast.

Sam
Kreeg, Wilkins' curmudgeonly Halloween-hating neighbor, scares trick-or-treaters off his doorstep with his dog dressed up. As the night proceeds, Kreeg encounters escalating phenomena: The house is egged; the lawn is filled with ornate jack-o'-lanterns; and the hallways and ceiling are scrawled with Halloween and Samhain greetings.

Kreeg is ambushed by Sam, numerous times, and eventually manages to unmask his assailant, whose head resembles a frightful hybrid of a skull and a jack-o' lantern. Kreeg shoots Sam several times with a shotgun, and pumpkin innards spray from the wounds, apparently killing Sam. But when Kreeg sits down, relieved, Sam begins to reanimate, proves difficult to kill and, after badly injuring Kreeg, he eventually has the old man cornered. Instead of killing Kreeg, Sam impales a candy bar in Kreeg's lap, completing the tradition of "handing out" candy on Halloween. Satisfied, Sam spares a confused Kreeg and ominously departs. Meanwhile, photographs burning in the fireplace reveal that Kreeg is the driver from the School Bus Massacre.

Conclusion
A heavily-bandaged Kreeg gives candy to trick-or-treaters. While on his front porch, he observes the street, where he witnesses other characters in the film mill about observing Halloween traditions. Billy sits on his father's porch, handing out candy to trick-or-treaters and enjoying himself. Rhonda crosses the street casually pulling her wagon filled with jack-o'-lanterns along, and is nearly run over by Laurie and the girls' SUV as they drive by laughing to each other. Emma and Henry arrive at home, Henry relaxes in his home while Emma blows out the jack-o'-lantern as Sam moves in for the kill for breaking a Halloween tradition. Kreeg retreats into his home, but immediately hears a knock on his door. These last trick-or-treaters are the children from the bus; they mockingly greet him. The film transitions to comic strips, showing the children brutally tearing apart and devouring Kreeg as revenge for their murder.

Cast

Production

Season's Greetings
Season's Greetings is an animated short created by Trick 'r Treat writer and director Michael Dougherty in 1996 and was the precursor of the film. The film featured Sam as a little boy dressed in orange footy pajamas with his burlap sack head covering, as he is being stalked by a stranger on Halloween night. The short was released as a DVD extra on the original release for Trick 'r Treat and was aired on FEARnet in October 2013 as part of a 24-hour Trick 'r Treat marathon on Halloween.

Filming location and delays

Trick 'r Treat was filmed on location in Vancouver, British Columbia. Originally slated for an October 5, 2007, theatrical release, it was announced in September 2007 that the film had been pushed back. After many festival screenings, it was released on home media in 2009.

Release

Theatrical screenings
The first public screening took place at Harry Knowles' Butt-Numb-A-Thon film festival in Austin, Texas, on December 9, 2007. Subsequent screenings included the Sitges Film Festival on October 7, 2008, the 2008 Screamfest Horror Film Festival on October 10, 2008, a free screening in New York sponsored by Fangoria on October 13, 2008, and another free screening in Los Angeles co-sponsored by Ain't It Cool News and Legendary Pictures on October 23, 2008. The film was also screened at the 2009 San Diego Comic-Con International, the Fantasia Festival on July 29 and 30, 2009, the film festival Terror in the Aisles 2 in Chicago on August 15, 2009, and the After Dark film festival in Toronto on August 20, 2009, at The Bloor.

The film had a theatrical release for the first time on October 6, 2022.

Home media
Warner Bros. Pictures and Legendary Pictures released the film direct-to-DVD and on Blu-ray in North America on October 6, 2009, in the UK on October 26, and in Australia on October 28. Shout! Factory released a "Collector's Edition" Blu-ray on October 9, 2018, with all extras from previous DVD/Blu-ray releases included as well as new extra content.

Merchandise
 Sideshow Collectibles created a 15-inch vinyl figure based on the film's scarecrow-like character Sam.
 NECA created a -inch scale figure of Sam that has been released as part of NECA's "Cult Classics" line of movie figures; the figure includes a stand, pumpkins, "candybar", lollipop, sack, and interchangeable, uncovered head.
 Palace Press and Insight Editions published a 108-page coffee table book entitled Trick 'r Treat: Tales of Mayhem, Mystery & Mischief. It documents the making of the film, and includes storyboards, concept art, cast and crew biographies, and behind-the-scenes photographs.
 Funko created a deluxe POP! figurine of Sam sitting on a boulder, alongside a jack-o-lantern and a burlap sack; it was released as a Spirit Halloween exclusive September 24, 2020.
Spirit Halloween also released a line of Trick 'r Treat themed decor and props. They released a lollipop that mimics Sam's, and a life-sized Sam animatronic that they used in their themes.

In 2017, Halloween Horror Nights brought the film to life with a scare zone. The reception led to a full maze for the event in 2018.

Comic books

DC Comics partner Wildstorm Comics had planned to release a four-issue adaptation of Trick 'r Treat written by Marc Andreyko and illustrated by Fiona Staples, with covers by Michael Dougherty, Breehn Burns and Ragnar. The series was originally going to be released weekly in October 2007, ending on Halloween, but the series was pushed back due to the film's backlisting. The four comics were instead released as a graphic novel adaptation in October 2009. Legendary Comics set the second Trick 'r Treat comic book, titled Trick 'r Treat: Days of the Dead, for an October 2015 release date, and features Arts of Artist Fiona Staples and Stephen Byrne. The comic was released alongside the graphic novel tie-in of Dougherty's Krampus.

Reception

Critical reaction
On review aggregator Rotten Tomatoes, the film holds an approval rating of 81% based on 32 reviews, with an average rating of 7.40/10. The site's critical consensus reads, "A deftly crafted tribute to Halloween legends, Trick 'r' Treat hits all the genre marks with gusto and old fashioned suspense." Dread Central gave it 5 out of 5 stars, stating, "Trick 'r Treat ranks alongside John Carpenter's Halloween as traditional October viewing and I can't imagine a single horror fan that won't fall head over heels in love with it." The film earned 10 out of 10 from Ryan Rotten of ShockTilYouDrop.com.

IGN called it a "very well-crafted Halloween horror tribute" and "a scary blast", rating it a score of 8 out of 10. Bloody Disgusting ranked the film ninth in their list of the "Top 20 Horror Films of the Decade", calling it "so good that its lack of a theatrical release borders on the criminal."

Awards
 2008 – Audience Choice Award, Screamfest Horror Film Festival
 2009 – Silver Audience Award, Toronto After Dark Film Festival

Possible sequel
Michael Dougherty announced in October 2009 that he was planning a sequel, but later stated that there was "no active development nor an attempt at a pitch." A sequel was announced in October 2013, but there was a change in Legendary's management. Dougherty has continued to express interest in a sequel but said the film stands on its own. In October 2022, Dougherty revealed that he was in "active development" of a sequel with Legendary Pictures, although the film had not been officially greenlit yet.

See also
 List of cult films

References

External links

 
 
 
 
 Trick 'r Treat at The Numbers

2007 films
2007 direct-to-video films
2007 horror films
2007 black comedy films
2007 independent films
2000s serial killer films
2000s supernatural films
2000s monster movies
American horror anthology films
American direct-to-video films
American supernatural horror films
American independent films
American zombie films
Buses in fiction
Demons in film
Direct-to-video horror films
Features based on short films
Filicide in fiction
Films about contract killing
Films about educators
Films adapted into comics
Films based on Little Red Riding Hood
Films set in the 1970s
Films set in Ohio
Films shot in Vancouver
Films about mass murder
American nonlinear narrative films
American serial killer films
American werewolf films
Bad Hat Harry Productions films
Legendary Pictures films
Films directed by Michael Dougherty
Films produced by Bryan Singer
Films scored by Douglas Pipes
Films with screenplays by Michael Dougherty
Halloween horror films
American films about Halloween
2007 directorial debut films
2007 comedy films
2000s English-language films
2000s American films